Mahalakshmi is an Indian actress in the Kannada, Tamil, Malayalam and Telugu film industries. Some of her notable films include Baare Nanna Muddina Rani (1990), Hendthighelbedi (1989), Parashuram (1989), Samsara Nouke (1989), Jayasimha (1987) in Kannada and Poo Manam (1989), Muthal Vasantham (1986), Vilichu Vilikettu (1985), Rangam (1985),  Nandri (1984) and Rendu Jella Sita (1983) in other languages.

She is married and currently living in Chennai. She has two daughters, one is completing aeronautical engineering and the other is studying Architecture

Selected filmography

Kannada
Mahalakshmi has appeared in the following Kannada films.

  Antharangada Mrudanga (1991)
  Durgashtami (1991)
  Maneli Ili Beedeeli Huli (1991)
  Mathru Bhagya (1991)
  Baare Nanna Muddina Rani (1990)
  Ivalentha Hendthi (1990)
  Swarna Samsara (1990)
 Gagana (1989)
 Hendthighelbedi (1989)
 Idu Saadhya (1989)
  Jacky (1989)
  Maha Yuddha (1989)
  Padmavyuha (1989)
 Parashuram (1989)
  Samsara Nouke (1989)
 Brahma Vishnu Maheshwara (1988)
  Matru Devobhava (1988)
  Nava Bharatha (1988)
  Nee Nanna Daiva (1988)
  Praja Prabhuthva (1988)
  Bhadrakali (1987)
 Jayasimha (1987)
  Mr. Raaja (1987)
  Thayi Kotta Thali (1987)
  Lancha Lancha Lancha (1986)
 Madhuve Madu Tamashe Nodu (1986)
  Prema Jala (1986)
  Samsarada Guttu (1986)
  Tiger (1986)
  Kumkuma Tanda Sowbhagya (1985)
 Swabhimana (1985)
 Baddi Bangaramma (1984)
  Pooja Phala (1984)
 Aparanji(1984) 
 Ananda Bhairavi (1983)
 TRP Rama (2021)

Tamil
Mahalakshmi has appeared in the following Tamil films. 

 Rani Theni (1982) - Debut in Tamil
 Ilayapiravigal (1983)
 Devi Sri Devi (1984)
 Nandri (1984)...Saratha
 Muthal Vasantham (1986)
 Enga Veettu Ramayanan (1987)
 Poo Manam (1989)
 Oor Panchayathu (1992)

Malayalam
Mahalakshmi has appeared in the following Malayalam films. 

 Angadikkappurathu (1985)...Neena
 Vilichu Vilikettu (1985)...Deepthi
 Rangam (1985)...Jayanthi

Telugu
Mahalakshmi has appeared in the following Telugu films.

 Rendu Jella Sita (1983)
 Ananda Bhairavi (1983)
 Kutra (1986)

See also
List of people from Karnataka
Cinema of Karnataka
Cinema of Tamil Nadu
Cinema of Andhra Pradesh
Cinema of Kerala
List of Indian film actresses
Cinema of India

References 

Actresses in Kannada cinema
Actresses in Telugu cinema
Actresses in Tamil cinema
Actresses in Malayalam cinema
Living people
Actresses from Tamil Nadu
Actresses from Chennai
Indian film actresses
21st-century Indian actresses
Year of birth missing (living people)